This is a List of the Carleton Hobbs Bursary winners, who thus gain a six-month contract with the BBC's Radio Drama Company.

Until 1997 two Bursaries were awarded each year, in 1998 the number was increased to six, and then in 2003 it fell back to five and in 2004 to four.

Winners
1953: Catherine Fleming
1954: Mary Ure (declined), Edward Kelsey, Aline Waite
1955: Geoffrey Hodson, Annette Kelly
1956: Rowena Cooper, Patrick Godfrey
1957: Anne Rye, Charles Kay
1958: Eva Gaddon, Jeremy Kemp
1959: Tobi Weinburgh, Derek Smith
1960: Nerys Hughes, Gareth Morgan
1961: Patricia Bendall, Stanley Lebor
1962: Sian Davies, David Valla
1963: Petronella Barker, Bruce Condell
1964: Leroy Lingwood, Rosalind Shanks
1965: Patricia Gallimore, Anthony Jackson
1966: Carole Boyd, Clive Merrison
1967: Alexandra Romanes, Michael Harbor
1968: Margaret Gouriet, Desmond McNamara
1969: Deborah Dallas, Geoffrey Collins
1970s: Susan Coward, David Timson, Gail McFarlane, Elizabeth Revill, Madeline Cemm, Ginette Clarke, Terri Lang, Mary Nelson, Alison Draper, Elizabeth Rider, Richard Griffiths, Andrew Rivers, Anthony Daniels, David Ericson, Andrew Seear, Tim Bentinck, Trevor Cooper
1980s: Kathryn Hurlbutt, Stella Forge, Alexandra Mathie, Eileen Tully, Jenny Funnell, Jane Leonard, Karen Ascoe, Victoria Carling, Cara Kelly, Jane Slavin, John McAndrew, Gary Cady, Simon Hewitt, Scott Cherry, Guy Holden,  James McPherson, James Good, Stephen Tompkinson, Dominic Rickhards, Charles Simpson
1990s: Cathy Sara, Annabel Mullion, Tracy Wiles, Amanda Gordon, Sarah Rice, Angus Wright, Robert Portal, Julian Rhind-Tutt, Nicholas Boulton, David Antrobus, Paul Jenkins, Mark Bonnar, Alistair Danson, Elizabeth Conboy, Priyanga Elan, Tilly Gaunt, Giles Fagan, Ben Crowe, Harry Myers, Fiona Clarke, Beth Chalmers, Gemma Saunders, Tom George, Christopher Kelham, Tim Treloar
2000: Helen Ayres, Clare Corbett, Jasmine Hyde, Thomas Arnold, Kenny Blyth, Simon (Alex) Trinder
2001: Helen Longworth, Sarah Paul, Jonathan Forbes, Carl Prekopp, Peter Darney
2002: Carla Simpson, Laura Doddington, Emma Callender, Scott Brooksbank, Simon Donaldson
2003: Jaimi Barbakoff, Gbemisola Ikumelo, Lydia Leonard, Damian Lynch, Chris Moran
2004: Emily Wachter, Alex Tregear, Rob Hastie, Stuart McLoughlin
2005: Ella Smith, Sophie Roberts, John Cummins, Nick Sayce
2006: Bethan Walker, Emma Noakes, Joseph Kloska, Paul Richard Biggin
2007: Joannah Tincey, Laura Molyneux, Alex Lanipekun, Sam Pamphilon
2008: Donnla Hughes, Jill Cardo, Gunnar Cauthery, Robert Lonsdale
2009: Melissa Advani, Emerald O'Hanrahan, Rhys Jennings, Piers Wehner, Joseph Cohen-Cole
2010: Leah Brotherhead, Claire Harry, Iain Batchelor, Henry Devas
2011: Alex Rivers, Francine Chamberlain, Adam Billington, Rikki Lawton
2012: Eleanor Crooks, Stephanie Racine, Will Howard, Adam Nagaitis
2013: Georgie Fuller, Arthur Hughes, Harry Jardine, Joel Maccormac
2014: Hannah Genesius, Roslyn Hill, Monty D'Inverno, Paul Heath
2015: Evie Killip, Caolan McCarthy, Rebecca Hamilton, George Watkins
2016: Natasha Cowley, Keziah Joseph, Catriona McFarlane, Luke MacGregor
2017: Abbie Andrews, Isabella Inchbald, Adam Fitzgerald, Gary Duncan, Tayla Kovacevic-Ebong
2018: Alexandra Constantinidi, Liam Lau Fernandez, Lucy Doyle, Cameron Percival, Saffron Coomber
2019: Laura Christy, Greg Jones, Lucy Reynolds, Will Kirk, Scarlett Courtney

References

Radio drama
BBC Radio